St Giles’ Church, Sandiacre is a Grade I listed parish church in the Church of England in Sandiacre, Derbyshire.

History

The church dates from the 11th century. The chancel was added around 1342. The church was restored in 1855 and 1866. Further work was carried out in 1883, when new pews and a new organ were installed, new bells provided, and gas chandeliers added. The floor was laid with Minton encaustic tiles and the walls were stripped of plaster.

Organ

The pipe organ was built by Nigel Church in 1977, in consultation with David Butterworth. A specification of the organ can be found on the National Pipe Organ Register.

See also
Grade I listed churches in Derbyshire
Grade I listed buildings in Derbyshire
Listed buildings in Sandiacre

References

Church of England church buildings in Derbyshire
Grade I listed churches in Derbyshire